Cameron Thomas Atkinson (born June 5, 1989) is an American professional ice hockey right winger for the Philadelphia Flyers of the National Hockey League (NHL). Atkinson was selected by the Columbus Blue Jackets in the sixth round, 157th overall, of the 2008 NHL Entry Draft.

Although smaller than most forwards in the NHL, he is known for his great speed, soft hands and excellent shooting skills.

Early life 
Atkinson was born on June 5, 1989, in Riverside, Connecticut, the middle child of five born to Tom and Ellen Atkinson. All of the Atkinson children began playing hockey at a young age, and while Cam dabbled in "pretty much every sport", his two passions were tennis and ice hockey. In 2004, Atkinson began attending Avon Old Farms, an all-boys' boarding school in Avon, Connecticut, known for its hockey team. When he was 15 years old, Atkinson fractured both his tibia and fibula during a hockey tournament in Marlborough, Massachusetts, and he was told by a doctor that he likely would not skate again. Atkinson's parents had the doctor put his leg in a splint while they sought another opinion. The second physician recommended that a rod and two pins be surgically inserted into Atkinson's leg, and he made a full recovery.

Playing career

Collegiate
He was ultimately selected in the sixth round, 157th overall, by the Columbus Blue Jackets in the 2008 NHL Entry Draft. Rather than enter the NHL right away, Atkinson chose to honor his commitment to play college ice hockey for the Boston College Eagles. His first collegiate goal was the game-winner in his debut game, a 5-4 win over the Wisconsin Badgers on October 10, 2008. He was named Hockey East's Rookie of the Week for the performance. Atkinson played in all 36 regular-season games for Boston College during his freshman 2008–09 season, recording seven goals, including two game-winning goals, and 12 assists for a total of 19 points. Despite the Eagles honoring Atkinson with the Bernie Burke Outstanding Freshman Award, he regarded his own season with trepidation, telling reporters that one "can't have the highest of expectations as a freshman".

In the 2009–10 season, Atkinson led the NCAA in goals scored with 30, including two in the National Championship game. During one stretch of the 2009–10 season Atkinson scored three hat-tricks in ten games.

Professional

Columbus Blue Jackets
On March 27, 2011, Columbus signed Atkinson to a two-year entry-level contract that included an amateur tryout agreement to finish out the 2010–11 season for the Springfield Falcons, the Blue Jackets' American Hockey League (AHL) affiliate. He made his professional hockey debut on April 1, 2011, scoring the game-winning goal in a victory over the Bridgeport Sound Tigers. He appeared in five games for Springfield that season, with three goals and five points in the process.

His first NHL goal was scored on October 10, 2011, against Cory Schneider of the Vancouver Canucks, a game the Canucks won 3–2. He was returned to Springfield after playing four games with Columbus in the 2011–12 NHL season.

After his return to the AHL, Atkinson was named to the 2012 AHL Eastern Conference All-Star Team on January 4, 2012, as a result of his impressive play with Springfield during the 2011–12 AHL season, with 15 goals and ten assists through 30 games. He was one of 13 rookies named to the two All-Star teams.

On April 5, 2012, Atkinson recorded his first career NHL hat-trick against the Colorado Avalanche in a 5–2 Blue Jacket win. Atkinson recorded his second hat trick against the Chicago Blackhawks to help the Blue Jackets win 5–2 on March 27, 2015. Atkinson recorded his third career hat trick during the 2015–16 season in a 5–2 win over the Montreal Canadiens.

During the 2016-17 NHL season, Atkinson experienced a breakout season, recording phenomenal numbers and helping the Blue Jackets ascend to the top of the standings. He was named to the 2017 NHL All-Star Game as a replacement for Pittsburgh Penguins star Evgeni Malkin, who was pulled out from a lower-body injury. Atkinson was previously considered to have been "snubbed" by being left off the original roster.

On November 16, 2017, the Blue Jackets signed Atkinson to a seven-year, $41.125 million contract extension worth $5.875 million annually. During the 2017–18 season Atkinson recorded his fourth hat trick against the Philadelphia Flyers to help the Blue Jackets win their sixth straight game.

Atkinson had statistically the best season of his career during the 2018–19 season. His 41 goals, 28 assists, and 69 points were career bests in each category. Atkinson also added 8 points in 10 games during the playoffs.

Philadelphia Flyers
On July 24, 2021, Atkinson was traded by the Blue Jackets to the Philadelphia Flyers in exchange for Jakub Voráček.

Career statistics

Regular season and playoffs

International

Awards and honors

References

External links
 

1989 births
Living people
American men's ice hockey right wingers
Avon Old Farms alumni
Boston College Eagles men's ice hockey players
Columbus Blue Jackets draft picks
Columbus Blue Jackets players
Ice hockey players from Connecticut
Sportspeople from Greenwich, Connecticut
Springfield Falcons players
People from Riverside, Connecticut
Philadelphia Flyers players
National Hockey League All-Stars
AHCA Division I men's ice hockey All-Americans